Unió Esportiva Olot, S.A.D. is a Spanish football team based in Olot, in the autonomous community of Catalonia. Founded in 1921, it plays in Segunda Federación RFEF – Group 3, holding home games at Estadi Municipal d'Olot, with a capacity of 3,000 seats.

History
The history of football in the city of Olot dated back to 1902, when the first games were played. There were two clubs in the beginning of the century, Olot Deportivo and Sport Club Olotí. Both were founded in 1912, and disappeared four years later. UE Olot was founded in 1921, but it was registered in the Catalan Football Federation only on May 14, 1922, under the name of Olot Foot-ball Club. Antoni Mota became its first president and the club's home ground was Camp de l'Estació.

Season to season

7 season in Segunda División B
28 seasons in Tercera División
1 season in Tercera División RFEF

Players

Current squad

References

External links
Official website 
Futbolme team profile 
Club & stadium history - Estadios de España 

 
Football clubs in Catalonia
Association football clubs established in 1921
1921 establishments in Spain